Carex lachenalii, called the twotipped sedge and hare's foot sedge, is a species of flowering plant in the genus Carex, native to temperate and subarctic North America, Greenland, Iceland, Europe, and Asia, and the South Island of New Zealand. Its diploid chromosome number is 2n=64, with some uncertainty.

Subtaxa
The following subspecies are currently accepted:
Carex lachenalii subsp. lachenalii – Northern Hemisphere
Carex lachenalii subsp. parkeri (Petrie) Toivonen – New Zealand

References

lachenalii
Plants described in 1801

Flora of Greenland